EuroBasket Women is a biennial international women's basketball competition held between the nations of FIBA Europe for women's national teams. EuroBasket Women is also used as a qualifying tournament for the FIBA Women's World Cup and also the Olympic Games.

History
The first tournament was held in 1938 in Fascist Italy, with participation of only five national teams. Despite losing to Lithuania (21–23), the host team won all other matches and captured inaugural title thanks to better head-to-head point difference among Top 3 teams. Lithuania and Poland took silver and bronze medals respectively.

The Second World War (1939–1945), which began the following year, interrupted the organization of women's basketball tournaments for a long time. The next continental championship was held in Hungary only 12 years later, in 1950. From 1950 to 1980, women's championships were held biennially each even year – unlike men's European Basketball Championship which were held each odd year. This tournament marked beginning of the era of dominance of the Eastern European teams which lasted for next four decades. In the last and decisive match of the final round hosts met with Soviet team. Hungary led after first half (24–22), but in the second half Soviets players looked much better. They managed to achieve victory (45–32) and to won its maiden European title. Czechoslovakia took bronze medals. At the next European Championship which was held in Moscow in 1952, Soviet team proved own dominance by beating Czechoslovakia and Hungary with margin of 23 points (52–29) and 30 points respectively (71–41). Two years later in Yugoslavia, Soviet team captured European title for third time by beating Czechoslovakia with margin of 7 points (69–62) in a decisive match of the final round. Bulgaria took bronze European Championship medals for first time. On the next tournament which was held in Czechoslovakia in 1956, Soviet team took gold medals for fourth time in a row by beating Hungarians in the final match (49–41) while hosts took bronze.

1958 European Championships which was held in Łódź, Poland became remarkable event. Soviet Union, the winner of four previous tournaments, lost European title for first time. In the decisive match of final round, Bulgaria led by Vanya Voynova managed to beat Soviet team in overtime (54–51) and to break Soviet dominance. This victory was remarkable – it's enough to say that this defeat (alongside with Soviet defeat to United States at the 1957 World Championship) remained the only two defeats in the history of participation of Soviet team at all international basketball competitions during very long time – till 1986. Next year Soviet Union took revenge by beating Bulgaria in the decisive match of the 1959 World Championship which was held in Moscow (51–38). The next European Championship was held in 1960 in Sofia, Bulgaria. Soviet team returned European title although this victory was more difficult. They achieved victory over Czechoslovakia (future bronze medalists) with margin of just two points (58–56). In the decisive match of final round, Soviet team again met with Bulgaria. After first half, Bulgarians led with margin of 9 points (22–13). However, in second half Soviet players managed to equal score and then achieve victory in overtime (52–50). Last 5 minutes and overtime of this match were played in an indoor hall of the National Stadium due to rain. Two years later European Championship was held in France. At the group round, Soviet Union defeated Czechoslovakia only in overtime (51–49). Later both teams reached final match where Soviet team won with a bigger advantage (63–46). At the next 1964 European Championships which was held in Hungary, Soviet team won third title in a row by beating Bulgaria in the final match with margin of just two points (55–53). Two years later at the 1966 European Championships in Romania, Soviet team won over Czechoslovakia in a final match (74–66).

1968 European Championships which was held in Italy became debut for legendary center Uļjana (Iulijaka) Semjonova. This giant 2.10-meter tall player played key role in Soviet team for next 18 years. From 1968 to 1985, she played at 10 European Championships and always won gold. Before Semjonova's debut, the vast majority of decisive matches were ended with favour of Soviet team but with relatively close margin. With Semjonova in the squad, the superiority of Soviet Union over opponents became overwhelming. Other prominent European basketball national teams at that time, such as Czechoslovakia, Bulgaria or Hungary were huge step behind the Soviet Union. Soviet team played 74 games during these 10 tournaments, and the slimmest margin of victory was 16 points. Another architect of the success of Soviet basketball was Lidiya Alekseyeva (1924–2014) who took direct participation in 16 Soviet victories at the European Championships – firstly as team captain (4 titles from 1950 to 1956), then as assistant coach (1962) and later as a head coach of national team (record 11 titles from 1964 to 1983). Soviet team was unbeaten not only in Europe, but also in the world. From 1959 to 1985, Soviet Union won all international competitions in which they participated without losing any match - 14 European Championships, 6 World Championships (1959, 1964, 1967, 1971, 1975 and 1983) and 2 Olympic tournaments (1976 and 1980).

After the 1980 Olympic Games and 1980 European Championships, it was decided to hold women's continental tournament biennially each odd year – just like men's European Basketball Championship. Soviet team continued to win but in late 1980s, as a result of changing of generation, their superiority became not such overwhelming as it was before. In 1986 they suffered first defeats at international competition for 28 years - at first, they lost to United States at the decisive match of the 1986 Goodwill Games with margin of 23 points (60–83) and next month they lost to US team with margin of 20 points (88–108) in the final match of home World Championship (both matches were played in Moscow). Nevertheless, Soviet team continued to dominate at European area. They won 1987 European Championship held in Spain after beating Czechoslovakia (89–81) in semifinals and Yugoslavia (83–73) in the final match. But next year at the 1988 Summer Olympics in Seoul, South Korea, Yugoslavia managed to perform better - they took silver medals by losing just 7 points to US team in the final match (70–77) while Soviet team surprisingly failed to reach final and unexpectively finished only at third place for first time in their history. At the group round of the 1989 European Championship held in Bulgaria, Soviet team defeated Czechoslovakia and Netherlands with margin of just 3 points (78–75 and 59–56 respectively) and then reached final where defeated Czechoslovakia once again with same margin (64–61). But at the 1990 World Championship in Malaysia, Soviet Union lost in the second group round to Czechoslovakia (79–82) and Yugoslavia (63–64) and finished only at fifth place. It was first and only time when Soviet team failed to reach podium at the international competition where they participated. Like two years ago, Yugoslavia took silver medals after losing to US in the final match (78–88).

At the next 1991 European Championship held in Israel, Yugoslavia managed to beat Soviet team at the group round (75–74). It was only second defeat of Soviet Union at the continental championships and the first since 1958. Despite this defeat, Soviet team reached final match where met with Yugoslavia once again. In this final, Yugoslavia led with margin of 14 points after first half (53–39), but in the second half Soviet players managed to change situation and won match with margin of 13 points (97–84). It was last participation of Soviet team at the European Championships. Their dominance at this tournament was simply unimaginable. The facts speak for itself: participation in 22 championships resulted in 21 titles as European Champions, 151 matches and 149 wins (the only two defeats: in overtime to Bulgaria in 1958 and one-point defeat by Yugoslavia in 1991), including 114 consecutive wins between 1958 and 1991. It's hard to imagine that any other team from any other sport could ever equal these amazing achievement. Next year the former Soviet players who completed for Unified Team at the 1992 Summer Olympics in Barcelona, Spain as a result of Soviet Union's dissolution in December 1991, managed to achieve surprising success after shocking victory over United States in semifinals (79–73) and victory over China in the final match (76–66). There was last participation of Soviet basketball at the international competitions and true "true swan song" of Soviet team which ceased to exist after that.

During four decades, vast majority of the European Championships ended with very predictable results - Soviet Union took gold medals while silver and bronze medals went to other Eastern European teams. However, in early 1990s situation totally changed after dissolution of Soviet Union, SFR Yugoslavia and Czechoslovakia. It opened way for the success of other national teams and made European Championships much less predictable. At the 1993 European Championships which was held in Italy, Slovakia took bronze medals and became only newly formed national team who managed to reach podium. For the first time, two Western European teams played in the final match – Spain took their maiden European title by beating France (63–53). It's remarkable that not one of medalists reached the podium at the next 1995 European Championships which was held in Czech Republic. Led by Olympic Champions Maryna Tkachenko and Olena Zhyrko, Ukraine became the first post-Soviet national team to win European title after victories over Russia in semifinals (69–64) and over Italy in the final match (77–66). Russian team also took podium after beating Slovakia in the bronze medal match (69–50). 1997 European Championships became successful for Lithuania who beat Slovakia in the final match (72–62) while Germany took bronze medals and reached podium for first time after the German reunification. Two years later Poland achieved their maiden success at the home 1999 European Championships by beating France in the final match (59–56) while Russia took bronze medals. In 2001 France also won maiden European title at home championship after victory over Russia in the final match (73–68).

The next two tournaments finished by final matches between Russia and Czech Republic. In 2003, Russia won with score 59–56 and achieved their first European title after dissolution of Soviet Union. In 2005, Czech Republic took revenge (72–70) and also achieved their maiden trophy while Spain won bronze medals for third time in a row. Two years later Russia won European title for second time after victory over Spain in the final match (74–68) while Belarus took bronze medals and reached podium for first time. In 2009, France defeated Russia in the final match (57–53) and became European Champions for second time while Spain finished 3rd. Two years later Russia won European Championship for third time by beating Turkey women's national basketball team in the final match (59–42). Nevertheless, it was first European medals for Turkish team. France won bronze medals. At next four European Championship, French team reach final matches but lost all four matches. In 2013 at the home championship, they lost final to Spanish team with margin of just one point (69–70). In 2015, French players lost final match to Serbia who won European title for first time. 2017 and 2019 finals were ended in favour of Spain who defeated France (71–55 and 86–66 respectively) thus becoming first national team since 1991 years who managed to defend their own European title. The next 2021 European Championship was co-hosted by France and Spain. It was won by Serbia – for second time in history. France lost final match for fifth time in a row (54–63) while Belgium finished in third place.

The 38 European Championship tournaments have been won by 11 different nations. The most successful nation is the now defunct Soviet Union with 21 titles. The other European Championship winners are Spain, with four titles; Russia, with three titles; France and Serbia, with two titles each; as well as Bulgaria, Czech Republic, Italy, Lithuania, Poland, and Ukraine, with one title each.

Results

Summaries

Medal table
Countries in italics no longer compete at the European Championships.

Participating nations

Most successful players
Boldface denotes active basketball players and highest medal count among all players (including these who not included in these tables) per type.

Multiple gold medalists

Multiple medalists
The table shows players who have won at least 7 medals in total at the Eurobasket Women.

Tournament awards
Most recent award winners (2021)

See also
 Basketball at the Olympic Games
 EuroBasket
 FIBA Women's Basketball World Cup
 FIBA Women's European Championship for Small Countries
 FIBA Europe U-20 Championship for Women
 FIBA Europe U-18 Championship for Women
 FIBA Europe U-16 Championship for Women

References

External links

 
European championships
Women's basketball competitions in Europe between national teams
1938 establishments in Europe
Recurring sporting events established in 1938